Emily May Blatch, Baroness Blatch,  (née Triggs; 24 July 1937 – 31 May 2005) was a British Conservative politician.

Born in Birkenhead, the daughter of Stephen and Sarah Triggs, she was educated at Prenton High School for Girls and at Huntingdonshire Regional College. At the age of 18, she joined the Women's Royal Air Force and served as an air traffic control assistant between 1955 and 1959.

Blatch entered politics in 1976 at the age of 39, as an elected councillor to Cambridgeshire County Council. Within a year she had been elected leader of the Conservative group and therefore leader of the council as the party enjoyed a majority at the time. She served as leader until 1989, during which time she helped pioneer reforming policies in education such as direct funding for schools from central government, a predecessor policy to the Academy (English school) programme introduced by the Labour government of 1997-2010 and later extended by the Conservative/Liberal Democrat coalition Government.

Blatch was appointed a Commander of the Order of the British Empire (CBE) in the 1983 Birthday Honours. She was created a life peeress as Baroness Blatch, of Hinchingbrooke in the County of Cambridgeshire on 4 July 1987.

From 1991 to 1994, she was Minister of State for Education and Immigration minister from 1994 to 1997. In 1997 she was given an honorary doctorate of Law from the University of Teesside.

Blatch was Deputy Leader of the Opposition in the House of Lords from 2001 until her death.

Family
On 7 September 1963, she married John Richard Blatch AFC (a RAF test pilot) and they had four children: David (1965–1979), Hon. James Richard (b. 1967) and twins, Hon. Andrew Edward (b. 1968) and Hon. Elizabeth Anne (b. 1968).

Death
Lady Blatch was diagnosed with pancreatic cancer on 23 December 2003 and died in London on 31 May 2005, aged 67.

References

1937 births
2005 deaths
Commanders of the Order of the British Empire
Conservative Party (UK) life peers
Life peeresses created by Elizabeth II
Members of the Privy Council of the United Kingdom
Deaths from pancreatic cancer
Members of Cambridgeshire County Council
20th-century British women politicians
Women's Royal Air Force airwomen
Women councillors in England